Major League Baseball games aired on the predecessor networks for the American pay television channel Freeform. These began in 2000, when the channel was known as Fox Family Channel, co-owned by News Corporation and Haim Saban, as a replacement for Thursday night games that had aired on Fox Sports Net in prior seasons, and also included some games in the postseason Division Series. After The Walt Disney Company bought the channel in 2001, renaming it to ABC Family, the games were moved to the Disney-owned ESPN channels, although the 2002 Division Series games that had been acquired as part of the purchase remained on ABC Family because of existing contractual obligations. Those games moved to ESPN the following year as well.

Background
In 1997, as part of its contract with Major League Baseball Fox Sports began to show games on its national network of regional sports networks, Fox Sports Net (FSN), which was given rights to two Thursday night games per week, one for the Eastern and Central time zones and one for the Mountain and Pacific time zones, though these games were often preempted in markets where they conflicted with the FSN affiliate's coverage of a local team.

Fox Family's coverage

In 2000, the former FSN coverage passed to Fox Family Channel on an alternating basis with then-sister network FX and was reduced to one game per week.

Starting with the 2001 season, Fox Family also carried games from the Division Series that did not air on the Fox broadcast network. Among the games that aired on Fox Family included one between the San Francisco Giants and the Houston Astros on October 4, 2001, in which Barry Bonds hit his 70th home run of the season, tying the all-time single season record that Mark McGwire had set only three years earlier.

Commentators

Play-by-play announcers for the FSN/Fox Family coverage included Kenny Albert, Thom Brennaman, Chip Caray, Josh Lewin, and Steve Physioc. Color analysts included Bob Brenly, Kevin Kennedy, Steve Lyons, and Jeff Torborg. 

Other commentators included:
Rod Allen (analyst)
Bert Blyleven (analyst) 
Dick Bremer (play-by-play) 
Joe Buck (play-by-play)
George Frazier (analyst) 
Kirk Gibson (analyst) 
Keith Hernandez (analyst) 
Rex Hudler (analyst) 
Mike Krukow (analyst) 
Duane Kuiper (play-by-play)
Tim McCarver (analyst) 
Dan McLaughlin (field reporter)
Rick Monday (analyst) 		
Brianne O'Leary (field reporter)
Ross Porter (play-by-play)
Mel Proctor (play-by-play)
Matt Vasgersian (play-by-play)

Regular season schedule (2001)
NOTE: The Thursday night telecasts on Fox Family were subject to blackout in the local markets of participating teams.

Simulcasts
The following is a list of local television stations that simulcast Fox Family's postseason coverage in 2001.

ABC Family
After Disney bought Fox Family in 2001 and renamed it ABC Family, the Thursday games were folded into the ESPN Major League Baseball rights package (and subsequently shifted to weekday afternoon "DayGame" broadcasts). However, the Division Series games aired on ABC Family (with ESPN's announcers, graphics, and music) for 2002 because of inherited contractual obligations. The only usage of the ABC Family "bug" was for a ten-second period when returning from a commercial break in the lower right corner of the screen. The following year the Division Series games also shifted to ESPN.

Game 2 (played on October 2) of the Minnesota–Oakland playoff series in 2002 started on ESPN2 because the San Francisco–Atlanta game (which started at 1 p.m. Eastern Time) ran over the three-hour time window. The game was eventually switched back to ABC Family once the early game ended.

Commentators

Chris Berman (play-by-play)
Tony Gwynn (analyst)
Brian Kenny (field reporter)
Gary Miller (field reporter)
Jon Miller (play-by-play)
Joe Morgan (analyst)
Dave O'Brien (play-by-play)
Jeremy Schaap (field reporter)
Mark Schwartz (field reporter)
Rick Sutcliffe (analyst)

Simulcasts
The following is a list of local television stations that simulcast ABC Family's postseason coverage in 2002.

See also
History of Freeform (TV channel)
List of programs broadcast by Freeform

References

External links
ABCFamily.go.com
ESPN.go.com
FoxSports.com
Searchable Network TV Broadcasts

Freeform
Fox Family Channel original programming
ABC Family original programming
2000s American television series
2001 American television series debuts
2002 American television series endings
Freeform
American sports television series
Sports telecast series